This is a list of biographies and autobiographies of cricketers.

List of biographies and autobiographies

References

Biographies and autobiographies
Cricket-related lists